HMS Venturer was launched at Livorno in 1807 as the French privateer Nouvelle Enterprise. The Royal Navy captured her in 1807 in the West Indies and initially took her into service. It renamed her Theodosia (or Theodocia) in 1808. She served in the Mediterranean until the Navy sold her in 1814. She then became the mercantile Theodosia. She traded between London and Rio de Janeiro and was last listed in 1822.

Capture
On 27 July 1807, HMS Nimrod captured the French privateer schooner Nouvelle Enterprise some 20 leagues east of Barbados. Nouvelle Enterprise, of Guadeloupe, was armed with a 12-pounder gun and four carronades, and had a crew of 55 men under the command of Captain Francis Penaud. The Royal Navy took her into service as HMS Venturer, later renamed HMS Theodosia.

Career
She was registered on 19 December 1808 as HMS Theodosia. Lieutenant Thomas Young commissioned her in 1809 for the Mediterranean.

In early September 1812 Theodosia, Lieutenant Younger, reportedly destroyed a privateer of 22 guns near Scio.

Theodosia took two prizes as well, La Pace and Betsey.

She also appeared in some memoirs. Lieutenant Young provided passage to James Silk Buckingham, and to the wife of an anonymous writer.

Theodosia returned to England and was paid off on 10 October 1814.

Disposal: The "Principal Officers and Commissioners of His Majesty's Navy" offered the "Theodosia schooner, of 128 tons," lying at Chatham, for sale on 15 December 1814. She sold on that day for £310.

Merchantman
Theodosia, a brig of 129 tons (bm) and Mediterranean origin, entered Lloyd's Register (LR) in 1815.

The Theodosia arrived in Table Bay, South Africa ex London and Rio de Janeiro on 18 November 1818 with John BROOKS, a gardener, and his wife on board.

Fate
Theodosia was last listed in 1822.

Notes, citations, and references
Note

Citations

References
  
 
 
 

1807 ships
Privateer ships of France
Captured ships
Schooners of the Royal Navy
Age of Sail merchant ships of England
Merchant ships of the United Kingdom
Ships built in Livorno